The phrase Audrey Rose may refer to:
 Audrey Rose (novel), a novel by Frank de Felitta 
 Audrey Rose (film), a film directed by Robert Wise, adapted from the de Felitta novel
 For Love of Audrey Rose, the sequel to the novel Audrey Rose